The ITF Women's Circuit is the second tier tour for women's professional tennis organised by the International Tennis Federation, and is the tier below the WTA Tour. In 2004, the ITF Women's circuit included tournaments with prize money ranging from $10,000 to $75,000.

The ITF world champions in 2004 were Anastasia Myskina (senior singles), Virginia Ruano Pascual / Paola Suárez (senior doubles) and Michaëlla Krajicek (combined junior ranking).

Tournament breakdown by region

*Includes figures for events in Central America and the Caribbean.

Singles titles by nationThis list displays only the top 20 nations in terms of singles titles wins.''

Sources
List of ITF World Champions
ITF prize money (1983–2008) 
ITF Pro Circuit Titles Won By Nations Players in 2004

References

External links
International Tennis Federation (ITF) official website

 
ITF Women's World Tennis Tour
ITF Circuit
2004 in women's tennis